La Vendetta , is a French comedy film from 1962, directed by Jean Chérasse, written by Albert Valentin, starring Francis Blanche and Louis de Funès. The film was known under the titles: "Bandito sì... ma d'onore" (Italy), "The Vendetta" (international English title).

Cast 
 Francis Blanche : Le capitaine Bartoli, a candidate for the town hall
 Louis de Funès : Valentino Amoretti, the robber of honour and father of Antonia
 Marisa Merlini : the postal worker
 Olivier Hussenot : Mr Lauriston, the gentle rentier
 Jean Lefebvre : Colombo, a supporter of Bartoli
 Rosy Varte : Mrs Marthe Lauriston, wife of the rentier
 Jean Hoube : Michel Lauriston, the nephew
 Christian Mery : the teacher, supporter of Bartoli
 Charles Blavette : Sosthène, a supporter of Corti
 Noël Rochiccioli : Colonna
 Juan Vilato : the partisan singer of Mr Lauriston
 Geneviève Galéa : Antonia Amoretti, the daughter
 Jacqueline Pierreux : the tourist, friend of captain
 Elisa Mainardi : daughter of Bastia
 Mario Carotenuto : Corti, a candidate for the town hall
 Jacqueline Doyen : (uncredited)
 Tintin pasqualini : (uncredited)

References

External links 
 
 La Vendetta (1961) at the Films de France

1962 films
French comedy films
1960s French-language films
French black-and-white films
Films directed by Jean Chérasse
1960s French films